Promises is the fourth studio album by The Boxer Rebellion, released worldwide on 13 May 2013. Four singles were released from the album; "Diamonds", "Promises", "Keep Moving" and "Always".

"Promises" featured in the Google Grad's campaign with "Keep Moving" and "New York" featuring in the TV series' Legit and Forever respectively.

"Always" was re-recorded acoustically to celebrate new guitarist Andrew Smith coming on board to replace Todd Howe and one other song, "I Fell in Love", left over from the sessions (but not included on the album) was released as a free download.

The album peaked at number 69 on the official Billboard 200 chart in 2013.

Track listing

References

External links 
 theboxerrebellion.com

2013 albums
The Boxer Rebellion (band) albums